Dan Jancevski (born June 15, 1981) is a Macedonian Canadian former professional ice hockey defenceman who played eleven seasons in the American Hockey League (AHL) and also in nine National Hockey League (NHL) games with the Dallas Stars and Tampa Bay Lightning.

Playing career
Jancevski was drafted 66th overall in the 2nd round of the 1999 NHL Entry Draft by the Dallas Stars.  In 2006, he signed with Montreal as a free agent; he was then assigned to the Canadiens' AHL affiliate, the Hamilton Bulldogs, where he helped the Bulldogs to the Calder Cup.

Jancevski signed a one-year deal with the Tampa Bay Lightning on July 6, 2007. He started the 2007-08 season with the Lightning's affiliate, the Norfolk Admirals. He received his first recall on November 21, 2007 and played in 2 games before he was returned to the Admirals. Jancevski was then traded back to Dallas for Junior Lessard on January 15, 2008.

On June 9, 2008, Jancevski was re-signed by the Stars to a two-year contract.

On July 15, 2010, Jancevski was signed by the Philadelphia Flyers to a two-year, two-way contract. He retired following the 2011–12 season.

Awards and achievements
2006-07 AHL  Calder Cup  (Hamilton Bulldogs)

Career statistics

References

External links
 

1981 births
Adirondack Phantoms players
Canadian ice hockey defencemen
Canadian people of Macedonian descent
Dallas Stars draft picks
Dallas Stars players
Hamilton Bulldogs (AHL) players
Ice hockey people from Ontario
Sportspeople from Windsor, Ontario
Iowa Stars players
Living people
London Knights players
Norfolk Admirals players
Sudbury Wolves players
Tampa Bay Lightning players
Texas Stars players
Utah Grizzlies (AHL) players